A first-time buyer (FTB) is a term used in the British, Irish, Canada property markets, and in other countries, for a potential house buyer who has not previously purchased a residential property.

A first-time buyer is usually desirable to a seller as they do not have to sell a property, and as such will not involve a housing chain.

There are many factors a first-time buyer may need to consider before purchasing their first property; how much initial cash they will need for stamp duty and any solicitors fees, and if they need to arrange a mortgage how much are they able to afford.

In many countries such as United Kingdom, Canada and Australia home ownership is seen as a natural step in the life cycle and the natural form of property tenure.  Canada and Australia have some of the most ownership rate in word (all above 65%) home ownership. Ireland has one of the highest proportions of owner-occupiers in the EU at around 80%.

In the UK in the 1980s almost half of all mortgages were taken out by first-time buyers. As of 2021, first-time buyers represented 50% of all mortgage house purchases in the UK.  In Ireland, FTB's represent 34% of the market.

In recent years the number of new buyers purchasing property has declined.

In the 2007 Scottish parliamentary election the Scottish National Party proposed a £2,000 grant for first-time buyers to help them get onto the property ladder.

Grants have not been forthcoming in the rest of the UK, but in July 2007 Housing Minister Yvette Cooper announced it would be broadening the government's Homebuy Shared Equity scheme to help buyers. "Unless we act now by 2026 first-time buyers will find average house prices are ten times their salary. That could lead to real social inequality and injustice," Cooper told Parliament.

Since then, first time buyers have regained momentum in the market, with reports in 2010 citing first-time buying as the most popular of consumer enquiries for a local, whole of market mortgage adviser - accounting for 37% of total enquiries.

In 2016 the UK Government launched the Help to Buy ISA for first time buyers through incentivising them to use savings to fund a deposit on a property. The money saved is then boosted by 25% up to a maximum of £3000. In April 2017, the Lifetime ISA was launched. It was launched to replace the Help to Buy ISA (which was closed in Nov 2019). The Lifetime ISA gives a similar 25% top-up from the government towards a First Time Buyer's home purchase, but also gives the flexibility to save the money and the top-up for retirement. The First Homes Scheme was launched in June 2021, which enabled first-time buyers, local people and key workers to purchase a property at a discounted rate.

The UK Help to Buy equity loan scheme closed to new applicants on 31 October 2022.

See also
 First time home buyer grant
 Help to Buy
 Canada Mortgage and Housing Corporation

References

Housing in the United Kingdom
Housing in the Republic of Ireland
Economy of the Republic of Ireland
Real estate bubbles of the 2000s